Vingtaine de la Moye (Jèrriais: "La Vîngtaine d'la Mouaie") is one of the four vingtaines of the Parish of St. Brélade in Jersey in the Channel Islands.

Together with the Vingtaine des Quennevais it forms part of "St. Brélade No. 2 district" and elects two Deputies.

Jersey's Prison is situated at La Moye. Also within the boundaries of the vingtaine are:
La Corbière
St Brelade's Church and the Fisherman's Chapel at the western end of St Brelade's Bay
La Pulente at the southern end of St Ouen's Bay
a number of megalithic sites, including the dolmen at La Sergenté and La Table des Marthes
the desalination plant
La Lande du Ouest, a Site of Special Interest
 La Moye School

References

la Moye
Saint Brélade